Stary Achkhoy (Jaşxoy-Khotar) is a rural locality (a selo) in Achkhoy-Martanovsky District, Chechnya.

Administrative and municipal status 
Municipally, Stary Achkhoy is incorporated as Staro-Achkhoyskoye rural settlement. It is the administrative center of the municipality and is the only settlement included in it.

Geography 

Stary Achkhoy is located on both banks of the Achkhu River.

The nearest settlements to Stary Achkhoy are Bamut in the west, Achkhoy-Martan in the north-west, Katyr-Yurt in the north-east, and Yandi in the east.

History 
In 1944, after the genocide and deportation of the Chechen and Ingush people and the Chechen-Ingush ASSR was abolished, the village of Stary Achkhoy was renamed to Kizilovo, and settled by people from other ethnic groups. From 1944 to 1957, it was a part of the Novoselsky District of Grozny Oblast.

In 1957, when the Vaynakh people returned and the Chechen-Ingush ASSR was restored, the village regained its old name, Stary Achkhoy.

Population 
 1990 Census: 658
 2002 Census: 911
 2010 Census: 940
 2019 estimate: 870

According to the results of the 2010 Census, the majority of residents of Stary Achkhoy were ethnic Chechens.

References 

Rural localities in Achkhoy-Martanovsky District